

Places
 Helmsley, town in England, United Kingdom
 Helmsley Castle, medieval structure
 The Helmsley Building in New York City, New York, United States

People
 Harry Helmsley (1909–1997), New York real estate investor
 Leona Helmsley (1920–2007),  hotel operator and wife of Harry Helmsley
 Hunter Hearst Helmsley, stage name for professional wrestler Paul Levesque (born 1969), better known as Triple H
William Helmsley, Member of Parliament

Other
 Helmsley, the hymn tune for Lo! He comes with clouds descending

See also
 Hemsley, surname